is a Japanese animated theatrical film released on December 7, 2013. It is the second crossover between the Lupin III and Detective Conan series following the 2009 television special Lupin the 3rd vs. Detective Conan. Incorporating various elements from its predecessor, the story follows Conan Edogawa who sets out to apprehend Lupin III, the suspect of stealing a jewel called the Cherry Sapphire.

The film was revealed in Shogakukan's Weekly Shōnen Sunday, issue 21-22 of 2013. It was nominated for the Japan Academy Prize for Animation of the Year.

Plot
Kaito Kid steals a fabulous diamond, but uses several techniques that differ from his traditional methods. Conan Edogawa pursues him, but is foiled by a shadowy figure using a sword to slice his skateboard in two; only then does he realize the true identity of the culprit: Lupin III. As it turns out, Lupin acts under coercion; his love interest, Fujiko Mine, is being used as a hostage, with an explosive collar around her neck which will detonate if Lupin does not cooperate. The theft of the diamond, which Lupin discards shortly afterwards, was nothing more than a test of his abilities, as his real target is a gemstone named the Cherry Sapphire his "employer", a mystery man calling himself Alan Smithee, is after. Mystified by Lupin's behavior, the Tokyo Police under Inspector Megure consults Lupin's would-be-nemesis Inspector Koichi Zenigata, with Miwako Sato and Wataru Takagi volunteering as assistants. However, despite Zenigata's precautions, Lupin, disguised as Takagi, manages to steal the gem and get away.

Simultaneously, Italian pop singer Emilio Baretti arrives in Japan to conduct a concert tour; but amidst the news coverage Conan notices Daisuke Jigen among Baretti's entourage. Ran Mouri's friend Sonoko Suzuki arranges for a pre-concert meeting with her idol in his hotel, but upon arrival they stumble upon Megure and the police in Baretti's suite, along with his manager, Claudia Belucci, and his producer, Luciano Carnevale. Baretti has received a threatening letter ordering him to cancel his concert or be killed. Despite the danger to Baretti's life, Carnevale insists that the concert take place as scheduled. When Ran and Sonoko decide to leave, Conan stays behind to look for Jigen, whom he finds acting as Baretti's bodyguard, although he evidently pursues yet another agenda.

In the meantime, Ran and Sonoko are suddenly joined by Baretti for a clandestine tour of Tokyo Skytree. Once there, he climbs to a high rampant in a desperate attempt to see the concert cancelled; when Ran finds him there, she begins reprimanding him, thinking he wants to commit suicide. A wind blast nearly blows them both off the tower, but they are saved by the combined efforts of Conan, Jigen and Sonoko. Chastised, Baretti confesses that Carnevale, who is affiliated with the Italian Mafia, uses his concerts as a cover to conduct illegal dealings, and therefore Baretti made up the threat to his life in order to have the Japan concert, an anacrusis for yet another deal, called off.

Eventually, Baretti's concert starts as scheduled. However, Carnevale manages to evade police surveillance and make his way to Haneda Airport, where he meets with Smithee to conduct the deal. However, it is revealed at this point that the middleman who arranged this meeting and the owner of the Cherry Sapphire were Jigen and Goemon Ishikawa; Lupin has been in fact hired by the Vespanian government to retrieve a rare piece of ore stolen by Carnevale, a mineral which enables the construction of ultimate stealth technology. Smithee, a native from the (fictional) country of Gillanba, intended to use the ore to offset the military might of a neighboring country, a purpose neither the late queen of Vespania, Sakura, nor her daughter and successor Mira have been endorsing.

However, Smithee has brought heavily armed reinforcements, and despite the help of most of Conan and Lupin's friends, Smithee finds an opening which enables him to take Conan as a hostage. Smithee and Carnevale attempt to escape by plane, but Lupin boards the craft, and he and Conan prepare to take down Smithee for good. Carnevale arrives and wildly fires a minigun at them, damaging the flight controls, mortally wounding Smithee and puncturing the hull, causing himself to be sucked out by the sudden decompression. When military jets attack, intending to destroy the ore samples before they can leave the country, Lupin reveals that the Cherry Sapphire is also made from a piece of Vespanian ore. After using it successfully to thwart the missiles shot at them, Conan and Lupin abandon the crashing plane via parachute and are subsequently picked up by a submarine temporarily appropriated by Fujiko and Ai Haibara. In a post-credit scene, Conan, Ran and Haibara see Baretti off safely as he departs Japan. Lupin, in the meantime, tries to steal a national treasure from a Kansai temple, only to find Kaito Kid having already beaten him to it and alerted the police as payback for dressing up as him.

Cast

Release
The movie was released by VAP on Blu-ray and two DVD editions in Japan on June 14, 2014. During the week of release the deluxe DVD edition sold more than 11,000 copies and the regular edition sold over 8,000 copies to rank second and third respectively on the animation DVD chart. The Blu-ray sold over 10,000 copies to rank #3 on the animation Blu-ray chart.

The movie was broadcast on NTV on January 30, 2015 and achieved a 14.9% audience share.

A subtitled version of the movie began streaming on the Hulu video service in North America in January 2015. Discotek Media released the film on DVD in North America on October 27, 2015 with English subs and released the film on Blu-ray on November 30, 2021 with an English dub.

The song "Wonderland" by Japanese rock band 99RadioService is featured as an insert song in the movie. A music video for the song that features clips from the Lupin III vs. Detective Conan: The Movie was available between January 9 and March 31, 2014.

Reception

Critical 
The film was nominated for the Japan Academy Prize for Animation of the Year at the 37th Japan Academy Prize.

Lupin expert Reed Nelson, in writing a feature titled Lupin the Third: The Complete Guide to Films, TV Specials and OVAs for Anime News Network, felt that Lupin the 3rd vs. Detective Conan: The Movie was not an element of the Lupin franchise that was worth viewing, describing the film as follows: "Subject to a downfall of many of Lupin'''s worst features, the runtime is far too long for the story, which naturally leads to too much talking and not much doing. However, Case Closed fans may indulge themselves in the abundant franchise in-jokes".

Box officeLupin the 3rd vs. Detective Conan: The Movie'' earned around US$6,288,900 at the Japanese box office in its first two days. This number increased to US$13,897,390 by December 15, 2013. The film earned ¥3.59 billion (US$34.4 million) in the month after being released. By January 7, 2014 the film had grossed ¥3.63 billion (US$34.7 million) and became the highest grossing Detective Conan film. By January 19, it had grossed ¥4 billion (US$38.29 million). By 2 February, the film had grossed ¥4,061,257,975 (US$39,694,735) at the Japanese box office.

References

External links

 

2010s heist films
2013 anime films
Case Closed films
Crossover anime and manga
Discotek Media
Films directed by Hajime Kamegaki
Films set in 2013
2010s Japanese-language films
Japanese crossover films
Japanese sequel films
Lupin the Third anime films
TMS Entertainment
Toho animated films
Films scored by Yuji Ohno